Emarginea dulcinea is a moth in the family Noctuidae (the owlet moths). The genus was erected by Harrison Gray Dyar Jr. in 1921. It is found in North America.

The MONA or Hodges number for Emarginea dulcinea is 9719.

References

Further reading

External links
 

Amphipyrinae
Articles created by Qbugbot
Moths described in 1921